Andy the Talking Hedgehog is a 2018 American children's film. The film stars Tara Reid, Dean Cain, and newcomer child actor Karina Martinez. It was directed by Joel Paul Reisig.

Plot

Animals and plants, including the hedgehog Andy and an evil cat, are given the ability to talk after a fairy grants a girl a wish. Andy starts his journey as soon as he begins to speak. He travels far across the country and struggles to combat robbers with his teeth. The girls father (Dean Cain) helps and the journey continues.

Production
The film was directed by Joel Paul Reisig, whose other films include Arlo the Burping Pig, Rodeo Girl, Amanda and the Fox, and Horse Camp. It was released by Reisig's company Be Your Own Hollywood. The film's poster was first revealed on Twitter by Tara Reid. The poster included co-stars Dean Cain and Karina Martinez. Reid stated that she was not taking the film seriously and that the poster is bad. She also said that "it's going to be fun; it's a cute movie".

Release
The film premiered at Sperry's Moviehouse in Port Huron, Michigan in 2018. It was released on DVD on May 7, 2019 by Echo Bridge Home Entertainment.

References

External links
 
 

2018 independent films
2018 films
2010s children's films
American children's films
Films about fairies and sprites
Films about hedgehogs
Films about wish fulfillment
2010s English-language films
2010s American films